Paula Contreras Márquez (Aldea de Los Zapateros, Córdoba, Andalusia, 8 January 1911 – Puerto Real, Cádiz, 3 February 2008) was a novelist and author of short stories and tales.

Marquez was honored by a route around the town of Moriles, which was depicted in many of her notable works.

Selected works 

 El brujo del tiempo (inicios de los 50)
 Cangilones de noria (1951)
 Historias de un pueblo sin historia (1952) (Prólogo de Federico Mayor Zaragoza)
 El Majuelo (1952)
 Americanos en Rota (1957)
 Una aventura sin importancia (1967)
 Laguna Grande (1992)
 Moriles, trazos de su historia (1995)
 La botica de la calle de la plaza (inacabada, últimos años)
 Un mes de permiso (sin fecha)
 La chavala(1962)

References

1911 births
2008 deaths
People from Córdoba, Spain
Spanish novelists
Spanish women novelists
Women writers from Catalonia
Spanish women short story writers
Spanish short story writers
20th-century Spanish novelists
20th-century Spanish women writers
20th-century short story writers